Wellingore is a village and civil parish in the North Kesteven district of Lincolnshire, England. The population of the civil parish at the 2011 census was 356. It conjoins the village of Navenby to the north. The Viking Way traverses through the village, passing from the side of the cliff edge to Ermine Street.

The name 'Wellingore' is thought to derive from the Old English for 'ridge at the place with the spring/stream'.

Population
In 1801 there was a resident population of 559, which peaked to 943 in 1861. In the 1971 Census there were 618 people recorded.

Buildings in Wellingore

Wellingore is an attractive village with many of the older houses built in the local limestone. Wellingore was the first village in North Kesteven to be designated a Conservation Area  in February 1971. The following buildings are of particular interest:
 All Saints Church Wellingore
 Wellingore Hall. The largest building in Wellingore is Wellingore Hall. 
The Manor House,  The Green.
Hill House, Barnes Lane
Village public houses are the Marquis of Granby and the Red Lion Inn, both on High Street.

RAF Wellingore
RAF Wellingore opened in 1935 and operated for ten years until it was decommissioned in 1945. It originally opened in 1917 as RFC Wellingore Heath. The control tower was demolished, but several pillboxes and the Battle HQ building still exist.

References

External links

 Parish council

Villages in Lincolnshire
Civil parishes in Lincolnshire
North Kesteven District